Manfred Wuttich (26 January 1941 – 31 July 2018) was a German footballer. He spent two seasons in the Bundesliga with Eintracht Braunschweig.

References

External links 
 

1941 births
2018 deaths
German footballers
Association football forwards
Bundesliga players
Eintracht Braunschweig players
VfL Wolfsburg players
Sportspeople from Frankfurt (Oder)
Footballers from Brandenburg